Servants in Heaven, Kings in Hell is the fifth studio album by hip hop group Jedi Mind Tricks. It was released September 19, 2006 through Babygrande Records. The first single, "Heavy Metal Kings", featuring Ill Bill of La Coka Nostra, was released in early August through iTunes and a limited edition vinyl pressing. Additional guest appearances on the album are provided by Shara Worden of My Brightest Diamond, Sean Price, R.A. the Rugged Man, Block McCloud and Army of the Pharaohs members Chief Kamachi and Reef the Lost Cauze.

Overview
As with previous Jedi Mind Tricks albums, many of the track titles appear to be lifted from previous songs by heavy metal groups.  For example, "When All Light Dies" was previously the title of a song by Trivium; "Serenity in Murder" is also the name of a Slayer track; "Razorblade Salvation" is also a song by Sinergy; and "Black Winter Day" is the name of a track by Amorphis. The album title, as well, could potentially be a reference to the Kreator track "Servant in Heaven (King in Hell)" from their Violent Revolution album. Much of the lyrics reference heavy metal also, i.e. "I'm a Cannibal Corpse" (When All Light Dies) and "Calculate infinity with The Dillinger Escape Plan." (Serenity In Murder).

Servants in Heaven became the group's most commercially successful release, being their first album to break into the Billboard 200, and also landed in the top ten on the Independent Albums chart, and the top fifty on the Top R&B/Hip Hop Albums chart. The album was warmly received critically, especially when compared to their two previous efforts, Visions of Gandhi and Legacy of Blood, which both received mixed reviews. Allmusic gave the album a positive four star rating; writer Marisa Brown stated:

An exclusive version of the album was released at Trans World Entertainment chain stores. This version features three bonus tracks, a remixed version of "Heavy Metal Kings", performed with California hardcore band Terror, the D-Tension mixtape track "Pretty Little Whores", featuring OuterSpace, and "Blitz Inc.", featuring King Syze and Esoteric, as well as a bonus DVD, featuring the "Heavy Metal Kings" music video.

Track listing

* = Bonus tracks

Samples
Put 'Em In The Grave
"Threat" by Jay-Z
"Twinz (Deep Cover '98)" by Big Pun
"Quiet Storm" by Mobb Deep

Suicide
"1-800 Suicide" by Gravediggaz

Serenity In Murder
"Made You Look (Remix)" by Nas (Vocals by Jadakiss)
"Still D.R.E." by Dr. Dre
"Day One" by D.I.T.C. (Vocals by Lord Finesse)
"Quiet Storm" by Mobb Deep (Vocals by Prodigy)

Heavy Metal Kings
"Estuans Interius" by Carl Orff
samples "Hell on Earth (Front Lines)" by Mobb Deep

Shadow Business
"Il Mio Coraggio" by Ornella Vanoni

Razorblade Salvation
"Dumb I Sound" by Sufjan Stevens

Outlive the War
"Noi Siamo Zingarelle" by Giuseppe Verdi

Gutta Music
"Yo No Soy Esa"by Mari Trini

Black Winter Day
"Tear Me Apart" by Alberto Daglio

Credits
Vinnie Paz - Lead vocals
Stoupe the Enemy of Mankind - Producer
R.A. the Rugged Man - Vocals
Shara Worden - Vocals
Ill Bill - Vocals
Sean Price - Vocals
Block McCloud - Vocals
Reef the Lost Cauze - Vocals
Chief Kamachi - Vocals
Terror - Vocals
OuterSpace - Vocals
King Syze - Vocals
Esoteric - Vocals
Crypt the Warchild - Additional vocals
Liz Fullerton - Additional vocals
Scott "Supe" Stallone - Production, mixing, engineering, bass, keyboards
D-Tension - Production
7L - Production
Damian Cusamano - Bass
DJ Kwestion - Cuts
Michael Sarsfield - Mastering
Chuck Wilson - Executive producer
Yan - A&R
Jesse Stone - Additional A&R, marketing
Jill Shehebar - International marketing
Michael Schiller - DVD creative
Paul A. Romano - Art direction, artwork, design

Singles

Charts

Awards
HipHopDX 2006 awards
"Verse Of The Year" - "Uncommon Valor: A Vietnam Story" (performed by R.A. the Rugged Man)

References

Babygrande Records albums
2006 albums
Jedi Mind Tricks albums
Horrorcore albums